A chore jacket or chore coat is a jacket made of robust cloth such as denim, heavy cotton drill or moleskin, with up to four large front pockets.

This type of jacket was originally worn as workwear by farm workers and laborers in late 1800s France, called bleu de travail ("working blue") for its indigo shade. It is therefore also called a French worker's jacket. It was worn with matching trousers, and was almost always blue, though carpenters wore black, and workers sometimes had a black jacket for the Sunday church service.

In the 2000s, the jacket gained popularity in Western countries as an item of smart casual attire, particularly among creative professionals. By 2016, all menswear brands in the United Kingdom sold cotton chore jackets, and the jacket continues to be made in France by traditional manufacturers. The photographer Bill Cunningham was known for wearing almost only blue French chore jackets.

The British donkey jacket, which has reinforced shoulder patches, is a similar garment.

References 

Jackets